Reon Moore (born 22 September 1996) is a Trinidadian footballer who plays as a forward for the Trinidad and Tobago national team.

Early life
Moore was born in Sangre Grande, Trinidad and Tobago.

Career

Club
In August 2022 Moore joined Guatemalan side Municipal.

International
On 23 March 2018, Moore made his debut for Trinidad and Tobago in an unofficial friendly against Guadeloupe. He made his official debut on 17 April 2018 in a friendly against Panama. On 2 July 2021, Moore made his competitive debut for Trinidad in 2021 Gold Cup qualifying as a substitute against Montserrat, scoring two goals in a 6–1 win.

Career statistics

Scores and results list Trinidad and Tobago's goal tally first, score column indicates score after each Moore goal.

References

External links

1996 births
Living people
Association football forwards
Trinidad and Tobago footballers
People from Sangre Grande region
North East Stars F.C. players
Defence Force F.C. players
TT Pro League players
TT Super League players
Trinidad and Tobago international footballers